The Kiltubbrid Shield is an Iron Age wooden shield from Ireland, discovered during the 19th century in the townland of Kiltubbrid, County Leitrim. It is probably the only perfect article of its description found in Europe, and dates from the late Celtic (La Tène) period.

Description
The Kiltubbrid shield is a remarkably well-preserved example of an ancient Irish wooden shield. Unlike ancient classic shields, through which the forearm was passed, the Irish wooden shield, grasped by the cross-piece underneath the umbo (boss), could be projected to full arm's length during battle. The wood was probably alder.

The shields was probably covered with leather, painted and decorated. The ribs show an indentation on one side, presenting a remarkable interruption in the symmetry of the ornament.  Shrinkage may have caused the indentation. MacAllister wondered if the indentation is a survival of the observation-notch which adorned shield edges in medieval time, or if this interruption of circular ornament reflected a widespread taboo and superstition against closed rings which prevailed at the time.

Etymology
Ruaidhrí Ó Flaithbheartaigh stated in Ogygia (1685) that the Irish name for alder was Fearn, because "shields are made of it". The Irish word "sciath", i.e. shield, is more recently applied to a shallow wicker basket, of oval shape — sometimes called a skib — used for straining potatoes, and which closely resembles in size and form of the Kiltubbrid wooden shield.

Purpose

The toughness and density of the alder would, in itself, be a firm defence against the thrusts of swords, if not spears, but half-inch thick wooden shields would be useless against Roman javelins.

An illustration sculptured on a stone cross at Kells, County Meath evidently depicts a conflict between different tribes or cultures; one armed with long-handled spears and circular bossed-shields, the opposing warrior shields have no boss, and are armed with short swords, of a kind often found on crannogs and first adopted with the introduction of iron as a primary material for weapons of warfare.

See also
 Keshcarrigan Bowl

References

Citations

Bibliography

 
 
 
 
 
 

Collection of the National Museum of Ireland
History of County Leitrim
Celtic art
Individual shields
Medieval defences